Justin Craig Duberman (born March 23, 1970) is an American former professional ice hockey right winger.
 
Duberman was born in New Haven, Connecticut, but grew up in Highland Park, Illinois. As a youth, he played in the 1983 Quebec International Pee-Wee Hockey Tournament with a minor ice hockey team from Chicago.
 
He played in the National Hockey League for the Pittsburgh Penguins.

Career statistics

See also
List of select Jewish ice hockey players

References

External links

1970 births
American men's ice hockey right wingers
Chicago Wolves (IHL) players
Cleveland Lumberjacks players
Cornwall Aces players
Ice hockey people from New Haven, Connecticut
Ice hockey players from Illinois
Jewish ice hockey players
Johnstown Chiefs players
JYP Jyväskylä players
Living people
Montreal Canadiens draft picks
Newcastle Cobras players
People from Highland Park, Illinois
Pittsburgh Penguins players
Portland Pirates players
South Carolina Stingrays players
North Dakota Fighting Hawks men's ice hockey players
Oakland Skates players